The 2009 Conference USA Football Championship Game was played on December 5, 2009 between the East Carolina Pirates, the champion of Conference USA's East Division, and the West Division champion Houston Cougars at Dowdy–Ficklen Stadium in Greenville, North Carolina. The game kicked off at 12:00 pm EST and was televised by ESPN2. The Pirates were looking to be the first team in C-USA history to win back to back conference championships, while the Cougars led by Case Keenum looked to win their 2nd.

Game summary

Under conference rules, the game is held at the home field of the team with the best record in conference play; since East Carolina finished C-USA play at 7–1, better than Houston's 6–2, the game was held at the Pirates' home field, Dowdy–Ficklen Stadium in Greenville, North Carolina.

Scoring summary

References

Championship
Conference USA Football Championship Game
East Carolina Pirates football games
Houston Cougars football games
Conference USA Football Championship Game
Conference USA football